Justice Party is the name of several different political parties around the world:

Justicialist Party, Argentina
Henry George Justice Party, Australia
Derryn Hinch's Justice Party, Australia
Justice Party (Azerbaijan)
Justice Party (Burma)
Justice Party of Denmark
Justice Party (Egypt)
Justice Party (Ghana)
Justice Party (Guyana)
Justice Party (India), 1916-1944
Indian Justice Party, 2003-2014
Justice Party (Indonesia)
Prosperous Justice Party, Indonesia
Communist Party of Persia, founded as Justice Party
Justice Party (Iran)
Justice Party (Kosovo)
Justice Party (Maldives)
Justice Party (Nigeria)
Justice Party (Norway)
Justice Party (Pakistan)
Justice Party (Philippines)
Singapore Justice Party
Justice Party (South Korea)
Justice Party - the Socialists, Sweden
Justice Party (Tajikistan)
Justice Party (Turkey)
Justice Party (Ukraine)
Justice (parliamentary group), Ukraine
People's Justice Party (UK)
Justice Party (2001 UK)
Justice Party (United States)
Justice Social Democratic Party, Uzbekistan

See also
Justice and Development Party (disambiguation)
Freedom and Justice Party (disambiguation)